The National Youth Alliance (NYA) was an American right-wing political group founded by Willis Carto, head of the right-wing Liberty Lobby.

The NYA was founded on November 15, 1968, at the Army and Navy Club. The NYA emerged from an earlier group connected to Willis Carto known as the Youth for Wallace, which had supported segregationist Governor George Wallace's bid for president as American Independent Party candidate in 1968. The NYA aimed to recruit students to counter liberal and Marxist groups on college campuses like Students for a Democratic Society.

Willis Carto was a devotee of the writings of Francis Parker Yockey, who revered Adolf Hitler. Yockey's book Imperium was adopted by Carto as his own guiding ideology and that of the National Youth Alliance.

Carto recruited William Luther Pierce to be NYA chairman. Pierce had previously been prominent in the National Socialist White People's Party (NSWPP), the successor organisation to the American Nazi Party (ANP) that fell apart after the August 1967 assassination of its leader George Lincoln Rockwell. Pierce joined the National Youth Alliance in 1970 after leaving the NSWPP. Pierce wrote The Turner Diaries while in the NYA.

By 1971, a rift had developed between Carto and Pierce. Accusations by Carto emerged alleging that Pierce had stolen the mailing list of his Liberty Lobby organization and used it to send letters attacking Carto's group. The group split into factions, with Pierce and his supporters forming the National Alliance.

References

External links
FBI file on the National Youth Alliance

Defunct organizations based in Washington, D.C.
Neo-Nazi organizations in the United States
Youth organizations established in 1968
Political youth organizations in the United States
Student political organizations in the United States
Youth politics in the United States
1968 establishments in Washington, D.C.